The Blood Compact (Spanish: El Pacto de Sangre) is an 1886 “historic and historical' painting by Filipino painter Juan Luna.

Description
The Blood Compact portrays the 1565 Sandugo (blood compact ritual) between Datu Sikatuna of Bohol and Miguel López de Legazpi, surrounded by other conquistadors. Datu Sikatuna was described to be 'being crowded out of the picture by Miguel López de Legazpi and his fellow conquistadores'.

Historical background
Juan Luna completed The Blood Compact in 1886, a year after he moved to Paris to open a studio. It was also the year after Luna became a friend of Félix Resurrección Hidalgo, another known Filipino painter.  In 1904, the painting won the first prize in Paris, France and at the St. Louis Exposition in the United States.  The masterpiece was painted by Luna during his four-year pensionadoship from the Ayuntamiento de Manila, enabling him to continue studying painting in Rome.  It is one of the three paintings Luna gave the Government of Spain, even though he was only obligated to paint just one canvas during the pensionadoship.  The other paintings are Don Miguel Lopez de Legazpi, a painting that was burned during the Philippine Revolution, and Governor Ramon Blanco, a work that became a part of the Lopez Museum collection.  This is one of the last paintings created by Luna. 

José Rizal and Trinidad H. Pardo de Tavera helped Luna in completing the painting by providing historical advice and posing for the painter: Rizal posed as Sikatuna while Pardo de Tavera posed as Legazpi.

The Blood Compact is currently displayed in Malacañan Palace, the official residence of the President, located at the top of the Grand Staircase leading towards the Ceremonial Hall.

Exhibition
In 2008, The Blood Compact and other Luna works became a part of a twenty-three painting exhibition from the collection of the Bank of the Philippine Islands. The public exhibition celebrated the thirtieth anniversary of the Bank of the Philippines Islands, and marked the first time that the so-called "BPI collection" was shown to the public. The Blood Compact and the other paintings are considered as the 'expression of the coming of the age of the Filipino and the birth of the Philippines as a nation in the late 19th century.'

See also
Spoliarium
España y Filipinas
Las Damas Romanas
The Death of Cleopatra

References

1886 paintings
Paintings by Juan Luna
Paintings in the Philippines
Malacañang Palace
Philippine paintings